Jimmy Kirkwood (born 12 February 1962) is a former field hockey player from Northern Ireland who represented both Ireland and Great Britain at international level. He represented Great Britain at the 1988 Summer Olympics when they won the gold medal. He also represented Ireland at the 1990 Men's Hockey World Cup. Kirkwood was also an Ireland cricket international.

Early years, family and education
Kirkwood was educated at Friends' School, Lisburn and Queen's University Belfast where he studied Economics. In his youth, in addition to playing field hockey and cricket, Kirkwood also included played rugby union, playing for Friends' School, Lisburn in the Ulster Schools' Cup.

Field hockey

Domestic teams
At senior club level, Kirkwood played for Queen's University, Belfast YMCA and Lisnagarvey. During his club career he won ten Irish Senior Cup winners medals. He won his first with Queen's in 1981 and his second with Belfast YMCA in 1985. Then between 1987–88 and 1993–94 he was an ever-present in the Lisnagarvey team that won the cup for seven successive seasons. He won his tenth medal when Lisnagarvey won the cup in 1996–97.

International

Ireland
Kirkwood was a member of the Ireland team that were silver medallists at the 1978 EuroHockey Junior Championship. Other members of the team included Martin Sloan, Billy McConnell and Stephen Martin. He made his senior debut for Ireland at the age of 18 in 1981. He subsequently represented Ireland at the 1987, 1991 and 1995 Men's EuroHockey Nations Championships. He also represented Ireland at the 1990 Men's Hockey World Cup. During the latter tournament, during a match against Canada, Kirkwood sustained a horrific injury when he felt the full force of an opponents stick in his face. He was taken to hospital and missed the rest of the tournament. In 2014 Kirkwood was inducted into the Irish Hockey Association Hall of Fame.

Great Britain
Kirkwood made his debut for Great Britain at the 1987 Men's Hockey Champions Trophy tournament. He subsequently represented Great Britain at the 1988 Summer Olympics, winning a gold medal.

Cricket
Kirkwood began playing for Lisburn Cricket Club as a schoolboy. In 1985 his man of the match performance helped the club win the NCU Challenge Cup, defeating NICC in the final. He also represented Ulster Country at senior interprovincial level. Kirkwood represented Ireland at schoolboy, under-19 and under-23 levels before making his senior international debut on 17 August 1983 against Gloucestershire. During the same tour, Kirkwood also featured in matches against Wales and the MCC. Kirkwood made 27 runs at an average of 8.6, with his high score of 27 coming against Gloucestershire,

Personal life
Kirkwood worked as a banker for HSBC in Belfast.
 Kirkwood is happily married with a couple of kids

Honours

Field hockey 
Great Britain
Olympic Games
Winners: 1988
Ireland
EuroHockey Junior Championship
Runners up: 1978
Lisnagarvey
EuroHockey Club Trophy
Winners: 1991: 1
Runners-up: 1989: 1
Irish Senior Cup
Winners: 1987–88, 1988–89, 1989–90, 1990–91, 1991–92, 1992–93, 1993–94, 1996–97: 8
Ulster Senior League
Winners: 1989–90, 1990–91, 1991–92, 1993–94, 1994–95, 1996–97: 6
Kirk Cup
Winners: 1989–90
Anderson Cup
Winners: 1986–87, 1993–94, 1995–96, 1996–97: 4
Belfast YMCA
Irish Senior Cup
Winners: 1985
Queen's University
Irish Senior Cup
Winners: 1981

Cricket
Lisburn
NCU Challenge Cup
Winners: 1985

Notes

References

External links
 

1962 births
Living people
Male field hockey players from Northern Ireland
Irish male field hockey players
Ireland international men's field hockey players
Olympic field hockey players of Great Britain
British male field hockey players
Olympic gold medallists for Great Britain
Olympic medalists in field hockey
Medalists at the 1988 Summer Olympics
Field hockey players at the 1988 Summer Olympics
1990 Men's Hockey World Cup players
Lisnagarvey Hockey Club players
Male field hockey forwards
Sportspeople from Lisburn
People educated at Friends' School, Lisburn
Alumni of Queen's University Belfast
Irish bankers
HSBC people
Lisburn Cricket Club players
Irish rugby union players